“‘Huch'uy Puka Q'asa’” (Quechua “huch'uy” little, “puka” red, “q'asa” mountain pass, meaning “little red pass”, also spelled “Uchuy Pucaccasa”) is a mountain in the Andes of Peru, about  high. It is situated in the Ayacucho Region, Cangallo Province, Totos District, northeast of Totos. Huch'uy Puka Q'asa lies south of Chawpi Urqu. The lake north of it is named Llulluchaqucha (Llullucha Ccocha).

References

Mountains of Peru
Mountains of Ayacucho Region